Castanopsis borneensis is a tree in the family Fagaceae. The specific epithet  is from the Latin, meaning "of Borneo".

Description
The bark is smooth or fissured.

Distribution and habitat
Castanopsis borneensis is endemic to Borneo. Its habitat is lowland dipterocarp and kerangas forests from sea-level to  altitude.

References

borneensis
Endemic flora of Borneo
Trees of Borneo
Plants described in 1889
Flora of the Borneo lowland rain forests